Aethalopteryx rudloffi is a moth in the family Cossidae. It is found in Eswatini.

References

Moths described in 2011
Aethalopteryx
Endemic fauna of Eswatini
Moths of Africa